The 1972 Colorado State Rams football team was an American football team that represented Colorado State University in the Western Athletic Conference (WAC) during the 1972 NCAA University Division football season. In its third and final season under head coach Jerry Wampfler, the team compiled a 1–10 record (1–4 against WAC opponents). They finished tied with UTEP for last in the WAC, and were outscored by a total of 413 to 128, being shutout in four games.

Schedule

References

Colorado State
Colorado State Rams football seasons
Colorado State Rams football